Kevin King (born February 28, 1991) is an American former professional tennis player who primarily played on the ATP Challenger Tour. He played collegiate tennis for the Georgia Tech Yellow Jackets and was a two-time ITA All-American (2011 and 2012) and a three-time All-ACC performer.

On May 7, 2018, he reached his highest ATP singles ranking of No. 162.

Challenger and Futures/World Tennis Tour finals

Singles: 9 (6–3)

Doubles: 25 (11–14)

Personal life
Kevin King is the son of Bill and Nuala King. He comes from a family of athletes – his father played football at Villanova and his sister, Lara, played tennis at Saint Leo University. Kevin graduated with honors from Georgia Tech with a degree in mechanical engineering.

In 2019, Kevin married Caroline Price, a fellow tennis player, who played collegiate tennis for North Carolina. Caroline is the daughter of former professional basketball player, Mark Price.

See also

 List of Georgia Institute of Technology athletes

References

External links
 
 
 Georgia Tech Yellow Jackets bio

American male tennis players
Georgia Tech Yellow Jackets men's tennis players
Tennis people from Georgia (U.S. state)
Georgia Tech alumni
1991 births
Living people
Tennis players at the 2019 Pan American Games
Pan American Games competitors for the United States